Aircraftman 1st Class Ivor John Gillett GC (16 September 1928 – 26 March 1950) of the Far East Flying Boat Wing of the Royal Air Force was posthumously awarded the George Cross for the gallantry he displayed on 26 March 1950. He was on board a Sunderland flying boat which exploded at its moorings in Seletar. The plane sank quickly and Gillett was thrown a life belt by rescuers on a launch. He selflessly threw the belt to an injured corporal, whom the rescue team hadn't spotted, and the belt kept the man afloat until he was rescued. The corporal had by then lost consciousness and would otherwise have drowned. Gillett disappeared in the confusion and his body was discovered two days later. His citation, published in the London Gazette on 3 October 1950, noted that he had "displayed magnificent courage. His extreme unselfishness in his last living moments, which resulted in the sacrifice of his life to save another, was seen in this act of great heroism which was in accordance with the highest traditions of the Royal Air Force."

Citation

References

1928 births
1950 deaths
British recipients of the George Cross
Royal Air Force recipients of the George Cross
Royal Air Force airmen
Accidental deaths in Singapore
Victims of aviation accidents or incidents in Singapore